The Oddities are a Canadian rap group from Toronto, Ontario. Members include Bookworm, J-StaRRRrrr!!!, Sny-Whip, JSN JNS, Psy, & Wysper.

History
Rap groups Awkward Why? and Dynasty began recording in 1996, and merged in 1998 to form the Oddities.

Oddities members have released a number of collaborative projects over the years, including in 2001 a 12" single, "Weak Days". Over time, other individuals participated in the group, including Kenny Neal (aka Bounce), Paul (pka Change), Naterrell, Retro Mosquito, and Bodible Oddities dancers Glizzii & Three (pka Daze).

The group's debut "family album", which showcased its members, was entitled "The Scenic Route", and was released on Battleaxe Records in 2003.  Bookworm produced the album.

Selected discography
"Alpha Flight" EP (Dynasty) - 1996
"Sprawl Xtreme: False Teeth" (Bookworm) maxi-single - 1997
"Claustrophonics" - 1997
"Six Bubbles" (Awkward Why?) - 1998
"Snidley's Lunchbox" EP - 1998
"Sprawlic Stream: Rites of Passage" (Bookworm) - 1999
"Paying for the Trip" (Bookworm) - 2000
"Weak Days" b/w "Pickup Rhyme" & "Hookers 'n Gin" 12" single - 2001
"The Scenic Route" - 2003/2004
"Rain All Day" (The Nope: Psy & Moka Only) maxi-single - 2009
"N.I.N.E." (Beatface: Book & Paul) - 2009
"Melba" (The Nope) - 2009
"Amy" (Beatface: Book & Paul) - 2011
"MODERNe" (The Nope) - 2011 (unreleased)
"Sinus" EP (The Nope) - 2014
"Extended PlayPen" (davepsy) - 2017
“Beyond the Arc” (davepsy) - 2020

Appearances
Jacked Surfing DVD 
"Muskoka Militia Vol. II" (2004)
"CBC Radio 3 - Just Concerts" (2003)

References

External links
Profile at Battleaxe Records
Profile at CBC
Profile at Urbnet RecordsArchived at the Wayback Machine
Profile at Urbnet Records

Canadian hip hop groups
1998 establishments in Ontario
Musical groups established in 1998
Musical groups from Toronto